Qaleh Juq (also Romanized as Qal‘eh Jūq, Ghal’eh Joogh, Qal‘eh Jaq, Qal‘eh Jokh, and Qal‘eh-ye Jūq) is a village in Dodangeh-ye Olya Rural District, Ziaabad District, Takestan County, Qazvin Province, Iran. At the 2006 census, its population was 383, in 78 families.

References 

Populated places in Takestan County